The Strange House is a 2015 Chinese 3D horror thriller film directed by Danny Pang Phat. The film was released on July 24, 2015.

Plot
Le Rong is chased by her uncles and aunties down to the river before being drowned by them. Yezi is working at a hair salon trying to save enough to pay her overdue rent, and is asked by Zijun to play the role of Le Rong because of their resemblance. Yezi decided to do it after the hair salon is closed down. Over time Yezi's begins to question her sanity as she begins having hallucinations. It is revealed that Yezi is actually Le Rong who is undergoing psychiatric treatment with her uncle Le Zijun. The movie ended with a closeup shot of a message left by Le Rong written in red ink.

Cast
Eddie Siu-Fai Cheung as Le Zijun
Jiao Xu as Yezi/ Le Rong
Song Yi as Nana
Zi-Tian Tian as Le Rong's aunty
Si-Yu Lu as Le Rong's uncle
Xiu-Ru Bi as Le Rong's grandmother
Teng-Fei Ma as Le Rong's father
Tan Wan as Le Rong's mother
Zi-Yao Lin as Le Yang, Le Rong's younger brother

Reception

Box office
The film earned  at the Chinese box office.

References

External links

通灵之六世古宅 (2015) at douban.com

2015 horror thriller films
2015 3D films
2015 horror films
Chinese 3D films
Chinese horror thriller films
Films directed by Danny Pang
2010s Mandarin-language films